Muhammad Abdul Elah Ahmed (born October 25, 1976 in Baghdad) is an Iraqi former swimmer, who specialized in sprint freestyle events. Ahmed competed for Iraq in the men's 50 m freestyle at the 2000 Summer Olympics in Sydney. He received a ticket from FINA, under a Universality program, in an entry time of 25.50. He challenged seven other swimmers in heat two, including teenagers Khalid Al-Kulaibi of Oman (aged 14) and Sikhounxay Ounkhamphanyavong of Laos (aged 17). Diving in with a 0.66-second deficit, he overhauled a 26-second barrier and came up with a spectacular swim to pick up a third seed in 25.84, 34-hundredths of a second below his entry standard. Ahmed failed to advance into the semifinals, as he placed sixty-fourth overall out of 80 swimmers in the prelims.

References

External links 

1976 births
Living people
Iraqi male freestyle swimmers
Olympic swimmers of Iraq
Swimmers at the 2000 Summer Olympics
Sportspeople from Baghdad